"Be Mine!" (stylized as "Be mine!") is a song recorded by Japanese singer Maaya Sakamoto, from the album Follow Me Up. It is the album's fourth single. It was released by FlyingDog as a double A-side single alongside the song "Saved." on February 5, 2014. The song was written by Sakamoto and composed by The Band Apart. It is the opening theme to the anime series World Conquest Zvezda Plot, for which Sakamoto voices the character of Kaori Hayabusa.

Chart performance
"Be Mine!" debuted on the Oricon Singles Chart at number 7, with 15,000 copies sold in first week. The single charted on the chart for eleven weeks, selling a reported total of 25,000 copies sold.

Track listing

Credits and personnel
Personnel

 Vocals, backing vocals – Maaya Sakamoto
 Songwriting – Maaya Sakamoto, The Band Apart
 Arrangement – The Band Apart, Ryō Eguchi, Tōru Ishitsuka
 Bass – Masakazu Hara
 Drums – Eiichi Kogure
 Guitar – Takeshi Arai, Kōichi Kawasaki
 Tambourine – Hiroyuki Watabe
 Electronic keyboard, programming – Ryō Eguchi
 Strings – Tomomi Tokunaga Strings
 Engineering – Naoki Hayami, Hiromitsu Takasu
 Mixing – Takayoshi Yamanouchi
 Mastering – Hiroshi Kawasaki

Charts

References

2014 songs
2014 singles
Anime songs
Maaya Sakamoto songs
Songs written by Maaya Sakamoto
FlyingDog singles